Learn: The Songs of Phil Ochs is a cover album by the band Kind of Like Spitting.  The songs included were all written by the U.S. protest singer Phil Ochs.  The CD booklet features Ben Barnett's studious commentary on the songs.  It was released on September 6, 2005 on Hush Records.

Track listing
 "I'm Tired" – 2:03
 "You Can't Get Stoned Enough" – 2:09
 "Draft Dodger Rag" – 2:18
 "That's What I Want to Hear" – 3:05
 "Outside of a Small Circle of Friends" – 3:08
 "Where Were You in Chicago" – 0:42
 "When I'm Gone" – 3:50 
 "I Ain't Marching Anymore" – 2:38
 "Remember Me" – 2:18

External links
Kind of Like Spitting on MySpace
Hush Records

2000 albums
Phil Ochs tribute albums
Kind of Like Spitting albums
Hush Records albums